Parc des Sports de l'avenue du Pont Juvénal, was a multi-use stadium in Montpellier, France.  It was the home ground of SO Montpellier until their next stadium Stade Richter opened in 1968.

External links
 Stadium information

Defunct football venues in France
Buildings and structures in Montpellier
1923 establishments in France
Sports venues completed in 1923
1969 disestablishments in France
Sports venues in Montpellier